Kaimai Road railway station is a proposed railway station in Imphal East district, Manipur. Its code is KMIRDL. It will serve Kaimai city. The station consists of two platforms. The work on this rail line is expected to be finished year 2019.

References

Railway stations in Imphal East district
Lumding railway division
Proposed railway stations in India